Virginia Bell may refer to:
 Virginia Bell (judge) (born 1951), Australian judge
 Virginia Bell (actress) (1934–2010), American topless actress
 Virginia Bell (baseball) (1927–1994), American baseball player
 Virginia Surtees (née Bell, 1917–2017), British art historian and author